Acrossocheilus baolacensis is a species of ray-finned fish in the genus Acrossocheilus.

References

Baolacensis
Fish described in 2001